Nikolai Leonidovich Dukhov (– 1 May 1964) was a Soviet designer of cars, tractors, tanks and nuclear weapons.

Biography
Dukhov was working in a tractor factory. In 1926, the factory Komsomol assembly sent him to study in an institute in Kharkiv, followed by a transfer without test to mechanical faculty in the Leningrad Polytechnical Institute to study engineer-design for tractors and cars. He was responsible for designing the Soviet tractors and heavy tanks in the 1930s.

In World War II he was the co-designer (along with Josef Kotin) of the Stalin heavy tank.

In 1948, he was nominated as the assistant to Yulii Khariton, the chief designer of the Soviet atomic bomb. He continued his work on nuclear projects until his death in 1964.

He taught in the Leningrad Road Institute and at mechanical faculty of the Leningrad Polytechnical Institute. He became a corresponding member of the Academy of Sciences of the Soviet Union (1953).

Awards
 Thrice Hero of Socialist Labour
 Lenin Prize
 Five Stalin Prizes
 Four Orders of Lenin
 Order of Suvorov, 2nd class
 Order of the Red Banner of Labour
 Order of the Red Star

References

1904 births
1964 deaths
20th-century Russian engineers
People from Gadyachsky Uyezd
Academic staff of Peter the Great St. Petersburg Polytechnic University
Peter the Great St. Petersburg Polytechnic University alumni
Communist Party of the Soviet Union members
Heroes of Socialist Labour
Stalin Prize winners
Lenin Prize winners
Recipients of the Order of Lenin
Recipients of the Order of the Red Banner of Labour
Recipients of the Order of the Red Star
Recipients of the Order of Suvorov, 2nd class
Russian mechanical engineers
Soviet mechanical engineers
Tank designers
Weapon designers
Burials at Novodevichy Cemetery